Passages is a Canadian short documentary film, directed by Marie-Josée Saint-Pierre and released in 2008. Using animation, the film retells the story of the difficult birth of her own daughter Fiona, and the medical complications that potentially threatened her own life.

The film premiered at the 2008 Toronto International Film Festival.

The film was named to TIFF's year-end Canada's Top Ten list for short films in 2008. It subsequently received a Genie Award nomination for Best Short Documentary at the 30th Genie Awards in 2010.

References

External links
 

2008 films
2008 short documentary films
2008 animated films
Canadian short documentary films
Canadian animated short films
Canadian animated documentary films
2000s English-language films
2000s Canadian films